Axtel is an unincorporated community within Breckinridge County, Kentucky, United States. St. Anthony's Catholic Church is located in Axtel.

History

William L. 'Billy' Cannon, tanyard owner and pioneer, and Ferd McClellan wrote on the application for a post office, "We have rote to ax yo to tel us a name fo our post office," and the post master wrote "A-X-T-E-L" will be the name of your post office." According to local tradition that's how the name Axtel came to be. The post office was established in 1891 but closed in 1977.  The name of the community may have been St. Anthony (after the church) before the post office opened.

References

Unincorporated communities in Breckinridge County, Kentucky
Unincorporated communities in Kentucky